Velyka Novosilka is an urban-type settlement in Volnovakha Raion, Donetsk Oblast (province) of Ukraine. It is the administrative centre of the Velyka Novosilka Raion. Population: .

It is also known as Bolshaya Yanisol.

Demographics

Notable residents
Mykola Shaparenko (born 1998), Ukrainian footballer 
Taras Stepanenko (born 1989), Ukrainian footballer 
Vladimir Takhtamyshev (1890s–1935), Ukrainian Greek participant in the Russian Civil War

References

External links 
 http://www.citypopulation.de/php/ukraine-doneck.php

Yekaterinoslav Governorate

Urban-type settlements in Volnovakha Raion